The year 1508 in science and technology included a number of events, some of which are listed here.

Events
 approx. date – Leonardo da Vinci completes writing the Codex Leicester.

Births
 December 9 – Gemma Frisius, Dutch mathematician and cartographer (died 1555).
 approx. date – William Turner, English naturalist (died 1568).

Deaths 

 
16th century in science
1500s in science